Winder Bolivar Cuevas Pérez (born 1 August 1988 in Oviedo, Pedernales, Dominican Republic) is a Dominican Republic hurdler.  At the 2012 Summer Olympics, he competed in the Men's 400 metres hurdles.

Personal bests
200 m: 21.25 s (wind: +0.4 m/s) –  Cali, 23 June 2013
400 m: 46.84 s –  Mayagüez, 8 October 2011
400 m hurdles: 49.20 s A –  Guadalajara, 27 October 2011

Competition record

References

External links

Sports reference biography
Tilastopaja biography

1988 births
Living people
Dominican Republic male hurdlers
Olympic athletes of the Dominican Republic
Athletes (track and field) at the 2012 Summer Olympics
Pan American Games competitors for the Dominican Republic
Athletes (track and field) at the 2011 Pan American Games